James Gray was a Scottish goldsmith working in Edinburgh during the reigns of Mary, Queen of Scots and James VI of Scotland.

Gray is known for the "Galloway mazer", a gilt cup now held by the National Museums of Scotland. He also engraved the brass plate for the tomb of Regent Moray (died 1570) in St Giles, Edinburgh.

He was a burgess of the Canongate. James Gray and the carpenter Andrew Mansioun were among the elders of the kirk of the Canongate in August 1567.

Gray sold pearls to Mary, Queen of Scots and refashioned and mended a basin and laver for her. He also worked for the royal mint as a "sinker" or engraver of dies. His colleagues at the mint included James Mosman an assay master, David Forrest or Forret, General of the coin house, Andrew Henderson, warden, and John Balfour, comptroller warden.

A mazer is a kind of cup with a wooden bowl and silver mounts. The Galloway mazer has a maple wood bowl and engraved silver-gilt mounts. It has the hallmarks of a stag for the Canongate and "IG" as the initials of the maker James Gray.

It was made for a wealthy couple, Archibald Stewart and Helen Acheson. Stewart was a wealthy merchant and a younger brother of James Stewart of Doune. Acheson was a daughter of the goldsmith, coiner, and mining entrepreneur John Acheson, and widow of another wealthy merchant, William Birnie. In September 1569 Regent Moray granted them the custom duties of the "Newhaven of Preston" also known as Acheson's Haven.

The mazer has their initials "AS EA", and the inscription from Proverbs 22, "Ane good mane (name) is to be chosen above great riches, and loving favour is above silver and above most fyne golde, 1569".

James Gray was likely a relative of the Achesons. An Isobel Gray (died 1565) was the wife of Alexander Acheson in Preston.

The mazer descended in the Stewart of Burray family to the Earls of Galloway. In 1954 the politician Jo Grimond spoke in the House of Commons that the mazer ought to be retained in Scotland, and it was purchased for the National Museums of Scotland with assistance from the Art Fund.

The brass used for Regent Moray's tomb was second-hand. Gray was paid £20 for engraving the inscription, which was composed by George Buchanan.

James Gray has been suggested as a possible maker of the Lennox jewel in the Royal Collection, along with the elder George Heriot and Michael Gilbert. The Lennox jewel is displayed at Holyrood Palace.

References

Scottish goldsmiths
Businesspeople from Edinburgh
Material culture of royal courts